This is a list of people who have served as Custos Rotulorum of Cambridgeshire. The office was created in 1368, at which time the Isle of Ely, Huntingdonshire and the Soke of Peterborough did not form part of the county.

 Sir John Hynde bef. 1544–1550
 Sir James Dyer bef. 1558 – aft. 1564
 Roger North, 2nd Baron North bef. 1573 – 1600
 Sir John Cotton 1600–1617
 Sir Edward Peyton, 2nd Baronet 1617–1618
 Sir John Cotton 1618–1621
 Sir John Cutts 1621–1636
 Sir Thomas Chicheley 1642–
 interregnum
 Sir Thomas Chicheley 1660–1689
 Edward Russell, 1st Earl of Orford 1689–1727
For later custodes rotulorum, see Lord Lieutenant of Cambridgeshire.

References
Institute of Historical Research - Custodes Rotulorum 1544-1646
Institute of Historical Research - Custodes Rotulorum 1660-1828

History of Cambridgeshire
Local government in Cambridgeshire
Cambridgeshire